The county governor of Møre og Romsdal county in Norway represents the central government administration in the county.

Romsdalens amt (with its current borders) was established in 1671, but after just four years (in 1675) it was divided into two amts (counties): Romsdal (which included Nordmøre) and Sunnmøre (which included Nordfjord). In 1680 (only 5 years later), Sunnmøre (including Nordfjord) was merged into Bergenhus amt. Then in 1689 (another 9 years later), the three regions of Romsdal, Sunnmøre and Nordmøre were again merged into one amt/county: Romsdalen. Then in 1701 (another 11 years later) Romsdalen amt was split and divided between Trondhjems amt (which got Romsdal and Nordmøre) and Bergenhus amt (which got Sunnmøre). In 1704 (a mere 4 years later), the three regions of Romsdal, Sunnmøre and Nordmøre were again merged into one county. The borders of the county have not been changed much since 1704. The annex parish of Vinje within the larger Hemne parish was transferred from Romsdalens amt to Søndre Trondhjems amt in 1838 (according to the 1838 Formannskapsdistrikt law, a parish could no longer be divided between two counties, so Vinje had to be in the same county as the rest of the parish).

The county governor is the government's representative in the county. The governor carries out the resolutions and guidelines of the Storting and Government. This is done first by the county governor performing administrative tasks on behalf of the ministries. Secondly, the county governor also monitors the activities of the municipalities and is the appeal body for many types of municipal decisions.

Name
The word for county (amt or fylke) has changed over time. On 1 January 2021, the title was again changed to the gender-neutral .

List of county governors
Møre og Romsdal county has had the following governors:

References

More og Romsdal
County Governor